Michael David Pollak (born February 16, 1985) is a former American football guard who played seven seasons in the National Football League (NFL). He was drafted by the Indianapolis Colts in the second round of the 2008 NFL Draft. He played college football at Arizona State.

Early years
Pollak graduated Corona del Sol High School in Tempe, Arizona, in 2003. While at Corona del Sol he played offensive guard and defensive tackle, and was regarded as a three-star recruit by Rivals.com. He received many honors including All-Region honors from Prep Star, first-team All-Arizona by The Arizona Republic and first-team All-City and All-Conference recognition as a senior. Pollak also was a star baseball pitcher receiving first-team All-Region, All-East Valley, and All-Conference.

College career
Pollak attended Arizona State from 2003-2007. Pollak was a starter at center during his junior and senior year. In 2006, he received All-Pac-10 Conference second-team and in 2007 he received first-team All-Pac-10 Conference honors. During his senior year, he was a finalist for the Rimington Trophy, which is awarded to the nations top center. In 2007, he received the Tim Landers Iron Man Award, Cecil Bono Team Captain Award, and Pat Tillman Award, all awards given out by the Arizona State Sun Devils.

Professional career

Indianapolis Colts
Pollak was drafted by the Indianapolis Colts in the second round of the 2008 NFL Draft. The Colts moved Pollak to guard and as a rookie he started 13 of 13 games. In 2009, Pollak entered as the starter at right guard.

Carolina Panthers
Pollak signed with the Carolina Panthers on March 22, 2012.

Cincinnati Bengals
Pollak signed with the Cincinnati Bengals on April 12, 2013.

On March 7, 2014, Pollak re-signed with the Bengals on a three-year contract.

The Bengals released him on February 20, 2015.

References

External links
Cincinnati Bengals bio
Carolina Panthers bio
Indianapolis Colts bio
Arizona State Sun Devils bio

1985 births
Living people
Sportspeople from Tempe, Arizona
Players of American football from Arizona
American football centers
American football offensive guards
Arizona State Sun Devils football players
Carolina Panthers players
Cincinnati Bengals players
Indianapolis Colts players